The Diversity Award is presented by Academy of Canadian Cinema and Television to honour excellence in English-language television programming that "reflects the racial and cultural diversity of Canada." It was introduced in 1988 as the Multiculturalism Award under the umbrella of the Gemini Awards, and renamed to the Canada Award in 1996.

Since 2013, the award has been presented as part of the new Canadian Screen Awards program. It was renamed to its current name in 2014.

National Film Board of Canada productions and co-productions have won approximately half of all Canada Awards.

Winners by year
 1992 Gemini Awards — Drums
 1993 Gemini Awards — It's About Time
 1994 Gemini Awards — Speak It! From the Heart of Black Nova Scotia
 1995 Gemini Awards — For Angela
 1996 Gemini Awards — Nuhoniyeh: Our Story
 1997 Gemini Awards — The Mind of a Child
 1998 Gemini Awards — The Road Taken and The Rez, Season 2 "They Call Her Tanya"
 1999 Gemini Awards — Loyalties
 2000 Gemini Awards — Unwanted Soldiers 
 2001 Gemini Awards — Made in China: The Story of Adopted Chinese Children in Canada 
 2002 Gemini Awards — Film Club 
 2003 Gemini Awards — Carry Me Home: The Story & Music of the Nathaniel Dett Chorale
 2004 Gemini Awards — Cosmic Current 
 2005 Gemini Awards — Two Worlds Colliding
 2006 Gemini Awards — Wapos Bay - "There's No I in Hockey"
 2007 Gemini Awards — Little Mosque on the Prairie
 2008 Gemini Awards — Qallunaat! Why White People Are Funny
 2009 Gemini Awards — Club Native
 2010 Gemini Awards — Reel Injun
 1st Canadian Screen Awards — Blind Spot: What Happened to Canada's Aboriginal Fathers?
 2nd Canadian Screen Awards — The Defector: Escape from North Korea
 3rd Canadian Screen Awards — The Exhibition
 4th Canadian Screen Awards — Canada in Perspective

See also
 Canadian television awards

Sources
Canada Awards Database
Canada Award form, Past recipients list

Gemini Awards
Multicultural and ethnic television in Canada
Diversity
Awards established in 1988
1988 establishments in Canada